Sir Thomas Bishopp, 1st Baronet (1550–1626), also spelt Bishop and Bisshopp, was an English politician.

He was the only son of Thomas Bishop of Henfield, Sussex and his wife, Elizabeth Belknap. He was educated at St John's College, Oxford (1562), Clifford's Inn and the Inner Temple (1572).

Before 1549, Thomas Bishopp senior had acted as feoffee to Elizabeth, who was a recusant. Her father, Sir Edward Belknap, was active both on the battlefield and as a court official during the 16th and 17th centuries. He had fought for Henry VII of England and been appointed to the post of "surveyor of the King's prerogative", which gave him the power to appropriate lands and property. By Thomas's marriage to Elizabeth he had obtained a considerable estate in Sussex.  They had settled at Henfield in Sussex where Thomas became a JP and attorney to the bishop of Chichester, Robert Sherburne (bishop 1508–36), who annexed the prebendary of Henfield in 1499 to his bishopric and then conveyed the estate to Thomas senior.

In 1560, Thomas junior was just 10 years old when he inherited from his father Thomas senior the parsonage and park at Henfield, the manors of Beeding, Drayton, Hunston, Stubcroft, and certain farms and stock including a flock of 1,000 sheep. However, as he was a minor he became the ward first of the very wealthy and influential Sir Richard Sackville (cousin to Anne Boleyn) and later of his son Thomas Sackville, 1st Earl of Dorset, a favourite of Elizabeth I. Thomas Bishopp's connection with the Sackville family explains his swift promotion to office in his father's adopted county and also his return to Parliament, first in 1584 for Gatton, then in 1586 and 1604 for Steyning. He was probably nominated for these seats in Parliament by Lord Burghley (Master of the Court of Wards amongst other lucrative offices) William Cecil, 1st Baron Burghley.

From 1578 until his death he sat on the Sussex bench as a Justice of the Peace. In the 1587 report on Sussex justices of the peace Bishopp was a "young man" who was a "good justice". He was appointed High Sheriff of Surrey and Sussex for 1584–85 and 1601–02.

He bought the Parham House estate, Sussex in 1597 and was invested by King James I as a knight on 7 May 1603 at Theobalds House, shortly after King James I had acceded to the throne. He was made baronet Bishopp of Parham in the County of Sussex in 1620 when almost 70 years old.

Sir Thomas Bishopp married, firstly, Anne Cromer, daughter of William Cromer, on 19 September 1577.  He married secondly, Jane Weston, daughter of Sir Richard Weston and Jane Dister.  Their eldest son was Sir Edward Bishopp, 2nd Baronet.  Their second son Henry Bishopp, was a Postmaster General of England and inventor of the first postmark used on mail.

References 

1550 births
1626 deaths
Alumni of St John's College, Oxford
Members of the Inner Temple
English MPs 1584–1585
English MPs 1586–1587
English MPs 1604–1611
Baronets in the Baronetage of England
Place of birth missing
High Sheriffs of Surrey
High Sheriffs of Sussex
People from Henfield
People from Parham, West Sussex